Declan Murphy may refer to:
Declan Murphy (Gaelic footballer) (born 1956), Irish Gaelic footballer
Declan Murphy (jockey) (born c. 1966), Irish jockey
Declan G. Murphy, a character in Law & Order:Special Victims Unit
Declan G. Murphy, urologist